This is the first edition of the tournament as part of the WTA Tour. Laura Garrone and Karin Kschwendt won the title by defeating Florencia Labat and Barbara Romanò 6–2, 6–4 in the final.

Seeds

Draw

Draw

References

External links
 Official results archive (ITF)
 Official results archive (WTA)

Internazionali Femminili di Palermo
1990 WTA Tour